Michael Wirth (born 1960) is an American businessman who has been the chairman and CEO of Chevron Corporation since 2018. Previously, he was the vice chairman of the company.

Early life 
After graduating from high school, Wirth attended the University of Colorado, where he earned a bachelor's degree in chemical engineering in 1982.

Career 
Wirth joined Chevron in 1982 and worked in multiple sectors including engineering, construction, and operations. He became president of marketing for Chevron's Asia, Africa and Middle East region in 2001.

He has been on the board of directors for Caltex Australia and GS Caltex. In 2018, Wirth was widely speculated and eventually confirmed to succeed John S. Watson as CEO of Chevron.

Climate Change Inaction 
Wirth's company, Chevron, is responsible for one of the highest total carbon emissions of any private company worldwide. Despite these practices, Wirth's company has been involved in several greenwashing tactics, and was found by a Federal Trade Commission to be misleading its customers on its efforts to reduce greenhouse gas emissions.  In response to CNBC host Jim Cramer asking if Chevron had considered calls to invest in alternative energy, Wirth responded that Chevron would "go back to our shareholders and let them plant trees".

In 2022, the Guardian newspaper named Wirth one of the US' top 'climate villains' due to Chevron's "greenwashing tactics to downplay the company’s environmental impact".

References 

1960 births
Living people
Directors of Chevron Corporation
Date of birth missing (living people)
Businesspeople from Colorado
University of Colorado alumni
American chief executives of Fortune 500 companies